{{Infobox ethnic group
|group      = Greeks in Italy
|image      = 
|population = '90.000 - 110.000 
|regions    = 
|languages  = Italian, Greek, Griko
|religions  = Catholic, Greek Orthodox
|related    = 
}}

Greek presence in Italy began with the migrations of traders and colonial foundations in the 8th century BC, continuing down to the present time. Nowadays, there is an ethnic minority known as the Griko people, who live in the Southern Italian regions of Calabria (Province of Reggio Calabria) and Apulia, especially the peninsula of Salento, within the ancient Magna Graecia region, who speak a distinctive dialect of Greek called Griko. They are believed to be remnants of the ancient and medieval Greek communities, who have lived in the south of Italy for centuries. A Greek community has long existed in Venice as well, the current centre of the Greek Orthodox Archdiocese of Italy and Malta, which in addition was a Byzantine province until the 10th century and held territory in Morea and Crete until the 17th century. Alongside this group, a smaller number of more recent migrants from Greece lives in Italy, forming an expatriate community in the country. Today many Greeks in Southern Italy follow Italian customs and culture, experiencing assimilation.

Ancient

In the 8th and 7th centuries BC, for various reasons, including demographic crisis (famine, overcrowding, climate change, etc.), the search for new commercial outlets and ports, and expulsion from their homeland, Greeks began a large colonization drive, including southern Italy.

In this same time, Greek colonies were established in places as widely separated as the eastern coast of the Black Sea and Massalia (Marseille). They included settlements in Sicily and the coastal areas of the southern part of the Italian peninsula. The Romans called the area of Sicily and the foot of the boot of Italy Magna Graecia (Latin, "Greater Greece"), since it was so densely inhabited by Greeks. The ancient geographers differed on whether the term included Sicily or merely Apulia and Calabria — Strabo being the most prominent advocate of the wider definitions.

Medieval

During the Early Middle Ages, new waves of Greeks came to Magna Graecia from Greece and Asia Minor, as Southern Italy remained governed by the Eastern Roman Empire. Although most of the Greek inhabitants of Southern Italy became de-Hellenized and no longer spoke Greek, remarkably a small Griko-speaking minority still exists today in Calabria and mostly in Salento. Griko is the name of a language combining ancient Doric, Byzantine Greek, and Italian elements, spoken by people in the Magna Graecia region. There is rich oral tradition and Griko folklore, limited now, though once numerous, to only a few thousand people, most of them having become absorbed into the surrounding Italian element. Records of Magna Graecia being predominantly Greek-speaking date as late as the 11th century  (the end of the Byzantine empire what is commonly known as the Eastern Roman Empire).  Recall that the Roman empire had become so vast that it was divided into two parts for administrative purposes.

The migration of Byzantine Greek scholars and other emigres from Byzantium during the decline of the Byzantine empire (1203–1453) and mainly after the fall of Constantinople in 1453 until the 16th century, is considered by modern scholars as crucial in the revival of Greek and Roman studies, arts and sciences, and subsequently in the development of Renaissance humanism. These emigres were grammarians, humanists, poets, writers, printers, lecturers, musicians, astronomers, architects, academics, artists, scribes, philosophers, scientists, politicians and theologians.

In the decades following the Ottoman conquest of Constantinople many Greeks began to settle in territories of the Republic of Venice, including in Venice itself. In 1479 there were between 4000 and 5000 Greek residents in Venice. Moreover, it was one of the economically strongest Greek communities of that time outside the Ottoman Empire. In November 1494 the Greeks in Venice asked permission and were permitted to found a confraternity, the Scuola dei Greci, a philanthropic and religious society which had its own committee and officers to represent the interests of the flourishing Greek community. This was the first official recognition of the legal status of the Greek colony by the Venetian authorities. In 1539 the Greeks of Venice were permitted to begin building their own church, the San Giorgio dei Greci which still stands in the centre of Venice in the present day on the Rio dei Greci.

Modern Italy

Although most of the Greek inhabitants of Southern Italy became entirely Latinized during the Middle Ages (as many ancient colonies like Paestum had already been in the 4th century BC), pockets of Greek culture and language remained and survived into modern times. This is due to the fact that the migration routes between southern Italy and the Greek mainland never entirely ceased to exist.

Thus, for example, Greeks Arvenites) sought refuge in the region in the 16th and 17th centuries in reaction to the conquest of the Peloponnese by the Ottoman Turks, especially after the fall of Coroni (1534). The Greeks from Coroni - the so-called Coronians - belonged to the nobility and brought with them substantial movable property. They were granted special privileges and given tax exemptions. Another part of the Greeks that moved to Italy came from the Mani region of the Peloponnese. The Maniots were known for their proud military traditions and for their bloody vendettas (another portion of these Greeks moved to Corsica; cf. the Corsican vendettas). 

When the Italian Fascists gained power in 1922, they persecuted the Greek-speakers in Italy. Today the Italian Greek is included in UNESCO's Red Book of Endangered Languages.

Griko people

The Griko people are a population group in Italy of ultimately Greek origin which still exists today in the Italian regions of Calabria and Apulia. The Griko people traditionally spoke the Griko language, a form of the Greek language combining ancient Doric and Byzantine Greek elements. Some believe that the origins of the Griko language may ultimately be traced to the colonies of Magna Graecia. Greeks were the dominant population element of some regions in the south of Italy, especially Calabria, the Salento, parts of Lucania and Sicily until the 12th century. Over the past centuries the Griko have been heavily influenced by the Catholic Church and Latin culture and as a result, many Griko have become largely assimilated into mainstream Italian culture, though once numerous, the Griko are now limited, most of them having become absorbed into the surrounding Italian element. The Griko language is severely endangered due to language shift towards Italian and large-scale internal migration to the cities in recent decades. The Griko community is currently estimated at 60,000 members.

Immigrants

After World War II, a large number of Greeks immigrated to countries abroad, mostly to the United States, Canada, Australia, New Zealand, The United Kingdom, Argentina, Brazil, Norway, Germany, United Arab Emirates, and Singapore.  however, a smaller number of diaspora migrants from Greece entered Italy from World War II onwards, today the Greek diaspora community consists of some 30,000 people, the majority of whom are located in Rome and Central Italy.

Notable Greeks in Italy
Peter of Candia antipope (1339–1410)
Pope Innocent VIII (1432-1492)
Francesco Maurolico mathematician and astronomer (1494-1575)
Nicholas Kalliakis philosopher (1645-1707)
Andreas Musalus mathematician and philosopher (1665-1721)
Simone Stratigo mathematician and natural science expert (1733–1824)
Ugo Foscolo writer, revolutionary and poet (1778–1827)
Constantino Brumidi historical painter (1805-1880)
Matilde Serao journalist and novelist (1856–1927)
Sotirios Bulgaris founder of Bvlgari jewelry (1857-1932)
Demetrio Stratos singer (1945–1979)
Antonella Lualdi actress and singer (1931)
Sylva Koscina actress (1933)
Fiorella Kostoris economist (1945)
Antonella Interlenghi actress (1960)
Anna Kanakis actress and model (1962)
Valeria Golino actress (1965)
Virginia Sanjust di Teulada television announcer (1977)
Nicolas Vaporidis actor (1982)
Chiara Gensini actress (1982)
Ria Antoniou model and actress (1988)
Viviana Campanile Zagorianakou beauty pageant contestant (1990)
Ludovica Caramis model (1991)
Kostas Manolas footballer (1991)

See also

 Calabrian Greek dialect
 Colonies in antiquity
 Greek coinage of Italy and Sicily
 Greek Orthodox Archdiocese of Italy and Malta
 Griko language
 Magna Graecia
 Grecìa Salentina
 Bovesia

References

Further reading

Jonathan Harris, 'Being a Byzantine after Byzantium: Hellenic Identity in Renaissance Italy', Kambos:  Cambridge Papers in Modern Greek 8 (2000), 25-44

Jonathan Harris, Greek Emigres in the West, 1400–1520 (Camberley, 1995)

Jonathan Harris and Heleni Porphyriou, 'The Greek diaspora: Italian port cities and London, c. 1400–1700', in Cities and Cultural Transfer in Europe: 1400–1700, ed. Donatella Calabi and Stephen Turk Christensen (Cambridge, 2007), pp. 65–86

Heleni Porphyriou, 'La presenza greca in Italia tra cinque e seicento: Roma e Venezia', La città italiana e I luoghi degli stranieri XIV-XVIII secolo, ed. Donatella Calabi and Paolo Lanaro (Rome, 1998), pp. 21–38

M.F. Tiepolo and E. Tonetti, I Greci a Venezia.  Atti del convegno internazionale di studio, Venezia, 5-8 Novembre 1998'' (Venice, 2002), pp. 185–95

External links
 Grika milume! An online Griko community
 Enosi Griko, Coordination of Grecìa Salentina Associations
 Grecìa Salentina  official site (in Italian)
 Salento Griko (in Italian)
 English-Griko dictionary

Ancient Greece
Italy
Ethnic groups in Italy
Greece–Italy relations